Toshikazu Hori is an electrical engineer at the University of Fukui, Japan. He was named a Fellow of the Institute of Electrical and Electronics Engineers (IEEE) in 2015 for his contributions to broadband antennae for cellular and satellite communications.

References 

Fellow Members of the IEEE
Living people
Japanese electrical engineers
Year of birth missing (living people)
Place of birth missing (living people)